Scene from the Great Flood or The Great Flood is an 1826 painting of Noah's flood by Joseph-Désiré Court. It was first exhibited at the Paris Salon on 4 November 1827 although - as a laureate of the Prix de Rome - he could not compete for the awards of that Salon. The French state purchased the work for 3000 francs and it is now in the Museum of Fine Arts of Lyon.

Description
The painting illustrates the biblical flood that wiped out humanity on earth. In the biblical story Noah and his family survive. The painting is seen as an allegory of a man clinging to his past. In the painting the man reaches out to save his father who represents the past, instead of saving his own son who represents the future or his wife who represents the current.

References

Bibliography
Bibliothèque-documentation du musée des Beaux-Arts de Lyon, dossier Scène du Déluge de Court.

1826 paintings
Nude art
Paintings in the collection of the Museum of Fine Arts of Lyon
French paintings
Paintings depicting figures from the Book of Genesis
Water in art
Paintings of children